Ivan Katanušić (born 22 May 1991) is a Croatian Paralympic athlete. He won the silver medal in the men's discus throw F64 event at the 2020 Summer Paralympics held in Tokyo, Japan. He is also a two-time bronze medalist at the World Para Athletics Championships and he has also won medals at the World Para Athletics European Championships.

References

External links
 

Living people
1991 births
Croatian male discus throwers
Paralympic athletes of Croatia
Athletes (track and field) at the 2016 Summer Paralympics
Athletes (track and field) at the 2020 Summer Paralympics
Medalists at the 2020 Summer Paralympics
Paralympic silver medalists for Croatia
Paralympic medalists in athletics (track and field)
Medalists at the World Para Athletics Championships
Medalists at the World Para Athletics European Championships
Sportspeople from Imotski
21st-century Croatian people